Zohreh Jooya is a singer from Mashhad, Iran.

Music career
Jooya's father was an Afghan (from Herat, Afghanistan) and her mother an Iranian and they married at a time that it was criminal for an Afghan man to marry an Iranian woman. Zohreh Jooya has been said to have moved to Europe for further advancement into music studies. After earning her classical music education from Amsterdam she then moved to Vienna in 1980, where she later earned a master's degree in opera at the Conservatoire of the City of Vienna. Both the Oriental, middle eastern and the European worlds influence Jooya.
She has created a new way of interpreting the traditional music of Persia, played on original instruments, presented on several albums. Koch International has produced Persian Nights and Taraneh Music has produced Journey to Persia. Her albums are an example of the beauty of the diverse ethnic music in Iran. Her works with Majid Derakhshani comprises poetry Shamsudin Mohammad Hafez, and Shafii Katkani played on Oriental and European instruments. Published by ARC Music "Music of the Persian Mystics"She also sings mystical songs from the ancient poet Nezami in "Shirin and Farhad", "The Indian Princess" and "Shahresad" with Parviz Mamnun, Professor of Persian literature.

International approach
Jooya's music builds bridges between the cultures of Iran, Afghanistan, and the Western world. Her European classical engagements have been, not only in diverse opera performances throughout many European countries, but also in the performance of the songs of Mozart, Beethoven and Schubert on television and radio shows. Currently, she performs at concerts throughout Europe covering a broad spectrum and from Italian baroque music to songs of George Gershwin.

Her newest album the only non-Iranian album Music from Afghanistan covers traditional folklore songs from Afghanistan. On this album, she performs together with the well-known singer Hamid Golestani, a Hazara from Afghanistan. The album was arranged by the masters Sobeir Bachtiar and Majid Derakhshani.

Albums
Persian Nights: Traditional Folk Music from Iran (1995), Koch International
Journey To Persia (1998), Koch International
Music of the Persian Mystics (2003), Arc
Afghan Music (2010), Arc – with Ustad Hossein Arman
Ensemble Afghan
Essence Of Love

References

External links
 Official website of Zohreh Jooya

Year of birth missing (living people)
Living people
20th-century Iranian women singers
Iranian people of Afghan descent
21st-century Iranian women singers